Messy Love may refer to:

"Messy Love", a song by Mura Masa from the 2017 album Mura Masa
"Messy Love", a song by Nao from the 2021 album And Then Life Was Beautiful